Calhoun County Library may refer to:

Calhoun County Library, a historic library building located at St. Matthews Calhoun County, South Carolina. 
Calhoun County Library, a branch of the Kinchafoonee Regional Library System